Stafford Hendricks "Pop" Cassell (February 8, 1909 – April 16, 1966) was an American football and basketball coach.

Coaching career
Cassell was the head football coach at American University in Washington, D.C. from 1940 to 1941 and at the Morningside College in Sioux City, Iowa in 1942.  His coaching record at Morningside was 2–6. His coaching record at American was 2–7–1.

Awards and honors
In 1969, American University established the Stafford H. Cassell Hall of Fame in his honor.

Head coaching record

Football

References

External links
 

1909 births
1966 deaths
American football quarterbacks
American men's basketball players
Basketball coaches from Pennsylvania
American Eagles athletic directors
American Eagles football coaches
American Eagles football players
American Eagles men's basketball coaches
American Eagles men's basketball players
Morningside Mustangs athletic directors
Morningside Mustangs football coaches
People from Shamokin, Pennsylvania
Players of American football from Pennsylvania
Basketball players from Pennsylvania